Zaba may refer to:

Places
 Zaba, a location given by Ptolemy in ancient Southeast Asia
 Zaba, Democratic Republic of the Congo
 Żaba, Opole Voivodeship, Poland

Other
 Zaba (surname)
 Zaba, a Croatian contraction of the Zagreb Bank (Zagrebačka banka)
 Zabasearch.com, a personal-information search engine
 Zaba, a 2014 album by Glass Animals
 ZABA, an acronym for Zine El Abidine Ben Ali, a former president of Tunisia

See also